Bloodtide is a Big Finish Productions audio drama based on the long-running British science fiction television series Doctor Who.

Plot
The Sixth Doctor and Evelyn meet Charles Darwin on the Galapagos Islands where an awakening group of Silurians have horrifying plans for mankind.

Cast
The Doctor — Colin Baker
Evelyn Smythe — Maggie Stables
Tulok — Daniel Hogarth
Sh'vak — Helen Goldwyn
Governor Lawson — Julian Harries
Emilio — Jez Fielder
Greta — Jane Goddard
Charles Darwin — Miles Richardson
Captain Fitzroy — George Tefler
Lokan — Jez Fielder

Notes
The play features an appearance by an adult Myrka, a type of monster previously seen in the TV serial Warriors of the Deep.

According to this story, humanity (Homo sapiens) are the result of a forbidden breeding program carried out by a renegade Silurian scientist.

External links
Big Finish Productions – Bloodtide

Sixth Doctor audio plays
2001 audio plays
Fiction set in 1835